Vendula Kotenová (born 6 November 1994) is a Czech luger.

Kotenová competed at the 2014 Winter Olympics for the Czech Republic. In the Women's singles she placed 24th. She was also a part of the Czech relay team, which finished 9th.

As of September 2014, Kotenová's best Luge World Cup overall finish is 35th in 2013–14.

References

External links
 

1994 births
Living people
Czech female lugers
Lugers at the 2014 Winter Olympics
Olympic lugers of the Czech Republic
Sportspeople from Jablonec nad Nisou
Lugers at the 2012 Winter Youth Olympics